The 2014 Youngstown State Penguins football team represented Youngstown State University in the 2014 NCAA Division I FCS football season. They were led by fifth-year head coach Eric Wolford and played their home games at Stambaugh Stadium. They were a member of the Missouri Valley Football Conference. They finished the season 7–5, 4–4 in MVFC play to finish in a tie for fifth place.

On November 25, head coach Eric Wolford was fired. He finished at Youngstown State with a five-year record of 31–26.

Schedule

Source: Schedule
^Game aired on a tape delayed basis

Ranking movements

References

Youngstown State
Youngstown State Penguins football seasons
Youngstown State Penguins football